Autódromo Aldea Romana de Bahía Blanca is a  motorsports circuit located in Buenos Aires Province, Argentina. It has hosted events in the Turismo Nacional and TC2000 series.

Following a decades' dormancy, the venue re-opened in 2020 with the first race of the Turismo Nacional Championship on February 23.

Motorsport venues in Buenos Aires Province